Hermissenda emurai is a species of brightly coloured sea slug or nudibranch, a marine gastropod mollusc in the family Facelinidae.

Distribution
This nudibranch was described from Niigata, Niigata Prefecture, Sea of Japan, Japan. Its distribution includes Korea and the Russian coast of the Japan Sea (although, no facts confirming distribution in Russia provided). It was (incorrectly) synonymised with Hermissenda crassicornis in 1983.

Description
The species grows to be about 50 mm, or about 2 inches.

References

Facelinidae
Gastropods described in 1937